Ishtar Terra  is the second largest of the three continental terrae regions on the planet Venus, the others being Aphrodite Terra and Lada Terra. It is a highland region named after the Akkadian goddess Ishtar, and is found in the north of the planet. In size, it is roughly between Australia and the contiguous United States, making it the second-largest of the terrae.

On one side of the mountain chain is the impact crater Cleopatra Patera,  in diameter filled with lava. Ishtar Terra contains the four main mountain ranges of Venus: Maxwell Montes on the eastern edge, Freyja Montes in the north, Akna Montes on the western edge, and Danu Montes in the southern region. These surround the lower plain of Ishtar Terra, which is named Lakshmi Planum (after the Hindu goddess Lakshmi). Ishtar Terra also contains volcanoes named after famous women: Sacajawea and Colette. Ishtar Terra is also the site of many tesserae, made by tectonic deformation.

See also
Geography of Venus
 Note that Ishtar Terra is located near the south pole if Venus's rotation is defined as prograde by the right-hand rule. The rotation of the planet is commonly characterized as retrograde in order to correlate its northern hemisphere with Earth's, in which case Ishtar Terra is near the north pole. This is the convention normally used for maps.

References

External links

IRISP Research Projects https://web.archive.org/web/20060511172654/http://irsps.sci.unich.it/research/projects/venus/ishtar/
WPT http://pds.jpl.nasa.gov/planets/captions/venus/perspect.htm
Funky Science https://web.archive.org/web/20070318150841/http://www.funkyscience.net/imagebank/channel_ishtar.html
NASA Map of Venus:

Surface features of Venus
Inanna